The 2016 Primera División season was the 35th professional season of Venezuela's top-flight football league.

Teams

a: Used for most of the Torneo Clausura as home stadium due to remodeling works at Estadio Olímpico de la UCV.

Torneo Apertura 
The Torneo Apertura was the first tournament of the season. It began in January 2016 and ended in May 2016.

Standings

Results

Knockout bracket

Top goalscorers

Source: Soccerway

Torneo Clausura 
The Torneo Clausura will be the second tournament of the season. It began in July 2016 and will end in December 2016.

Standings

Results

Knockout bracket

Top goalscorers

Source: Soccerway

Serie Final 

Zamora won 4–2 on aggregate.

Aggregate table

Best of the Year 
The Uruguayan newspaper El País chose the best player, manager and club of the 2016 season. 

 Player of the Year: Jefferson Savarino.

 Manager of the Year: Francesco Stifano.

 Club of the Year: Zamora FC.

Team of the Year 
The newly formed AUFP chose the team of the year.

References

External links 
  of the Venezuelan Football Federation 
Season regulations 

2016 in South American football leagues
Venezuelan Primera División seasons
2016 in Venezuelan football